Isophorone diisocyanate (IPDI) is an organic compound in the class known as isocyanates. More specifically, it is an aliphatic diisocyanate. It is produced in relatively small quantities, accounting for (with hexamethylene diisocyanate) only 3.4% of the global diisocyanate market in the year 2000. Aliphatic diisocyanates are used, not in the production of polyurethane foam, but in special applications, such as enamel coatings which are resistant to abrasion and degradation from ultraviolet light. These properties are particularly desirable in, for instance, the exterior paint applied to aircraft.

Synthesis
IPDI is obtained by phosgenation of isophorone diamine:

Chemistry
IPDI exists in two stereoisomers, cis and trans. Their reactivities are similar. Each stereoisomer is an unsymmetrical molecule, and thus has isocyanate groups with different reactivities. The primary isocyanate group is more reactive than the secondary isocyanate group.

See also
 Methylene diphenyl diisocyanate
 Toluene diisocyanate
 Hexamethylene diisocyanate
 Tetramethylxylene diisocyanate

References

External links
 NIOSH Safety and Health Topic: Isocyanates, from the website of the National Institute for Occupational Safety and Health (NIOSH)
 Isophorone diisocyanate - NIOSH Pocket Guide to Chemical Hazards

Isocyanates